Jorma Juhani Valtonen (born 22 December 1946) is a Finnish former professional ice hockey goaltender who played in the SM-liiga.

Valtonen, who was born in Turku, Finland, played for Jokerit, TPS, RU-38 and Ässät. In Italy Valtonen played for HC Gherdëina and HC Alleghe. In West Germany he played for EHC 70 München on season 1980–81. He was inducted into the Finnish Hockey Hall of Fame in 1989 and IIHF Hall of Fame in 1999. Valtonen was the goalie for the Finnish Olympic team in 1980 that placed 4th and lost to the U.S. 4–2 in the final game, that earned the U.S. their improbable gold medal. Valtonen has been an Italian league champion and a three-time Finnish league champion.

After retiring, Valtonen became a coach. He was head coach of the Finland women's national ice hockey team and the TPS women's team before becoming the goaltending coach of the Kontinental Hockey League's Lokomotiv Yaroslavl. He was not aboard the flight of the 2011 Lokomotiv Yaroslavl plane crash, when all players from the main roster, four players from the youth team, and eleven staff members perished in that crash, except for main roster player Maxim Zyuzyakin, who was also not aboard the plane. Valtonen was asked to stay behind to work with the junior team.

In 2015, Valtonen returned to Italy to become goaltending coach of his former team HC Gherdëina. He currently serves as goaltending coach of Asiago.

References

External links
Finnish Hockey Hall of Fame page

1946 births
Living people
Ässät players
Finnish expatriate ice hockey players in Italy
Finnish ice hockey goaltenders
HC TPS players
Ice hockey players at the 1972 Winter Olympics
Ice hockey players at the 1980 Winter Olympics
Ice hockey players at the 1984 Winter Olympics
IIHF Hall of Fame inductees
Jokerit players
Olympic ice hockey players of Finland
Serie A (ice hockey) players
Sportspeople from Turku
HC Gardena players
HC Alleghe players
Finnish ice hockey coaches
Finnish expatriate ice hockey coaches
Finnish expatriate sportspeople in West Germany
Finnish expatriate sportspeople in Russia